The Amduat (literally "That Which Is In the Afterworld", also translated as "Text of the Hidden Chamber Which is in the Underworld" and "Book of What is in the Underworld") is an important ancient Egyptian funerary text of the New Kingdom of Egypt. Like many funerary texts, it was found written on the inside of the pharaoh's tomb for reference. Unlike other funerary texts, however, it was reserved only for pharaohs (until the Twenty-first Dynasty almost exclusively) or very favored nobility.

It tells the story of Ra, the Egyptian sun god who travels through the underworld, from the time when the sun sets in the west and rises again in the east. It is said that the dead Pharaoh is taking this same journey, ultimately to become one with Ra and live forever.

The underworld is divided into twelve hours of the night, each representing different allies and enemies for the Pharaoh/sun god to encounter. The Amduat names all of these gods and monsters. The main purpose of the Amduat is to give the names of these gods and monsters to the spirit of the dead Pharaoh, so he can call upon them for help or use their name to defeat them.

As well as enumerating and naming the inhabitants of the Duat, both good and bad, the illustrations of the work show clearly the topography of the underworld. The earliest complete version of the Amduat is found in KV34, the tomb of Thutmose III in the Valley of the Kings.

The hours 

In hour 1 the sun god enters the western horizon (akhet) which is a transition between day and night.  

In hours 2 and 3 he passes through an abundant watery world called 'Wernes' and the 'Waters of Osiris'.  

In hour 4 he reaches Imhet the difficult sandy realm of Seker, the underworld hawk deity, where he encounters dark zig zag pathways which he has to negotiate, being dragged on a snake-boat.  

In hour 5 he discovers the tomb of Osiris which is an enclosure beneath which is hidden a lake of fire; the tomb is covered by a pyramid-like mound (identified with the goddess Isis) and on top of which Isis and Nephthys have alighted in the form of two kites (birds of prey).  

In the sixth hour the most significant event in the underworld occurs. The ba (or soul) of Ra unites with his own body, or alternatively with the ba of Osiris within the circle formed by the mehen serpent. This event is the point at which the sun begins its regeneration; it is a moment of great significance, but also danger.

In hour 7 the adversary Apep (Apophis) lies in wait and has to be subdued in chains by the magic of Isis and Ser, and the strength of Serqet, who is assisted by the god Her-Tesu-F.

In hour 8 the sun god opens the doors of the tomb and Horus calls upon a monstrous serpent with the unquenchable fire to destroy the enemies of his father, Osiris, by burning their corpses and cooking their souls.

In hour 9 they leave the sandy island of Seker by rowing vigorously back into the waters.

In hour 10 the regeneration process continues through immersion in the waters.

In hour 11 the god's eyes (a symbol for his health and well-being) are fully regenerated.

In hour 12 he enters the eastern horizon ready to rise again as the new day's sun.

Once the deceased finished their journey through the underworld, they arrived at the Hall of Maat. Here they would undergo the Weighing of the Heart ceremony where their purity would be the determining factor in whether they would be allowed to enter the Kingdom of Osiris.

Notes

References
Forman, Werner and Stephen Quirke. (1996). Hieroglyphs and the Afterlife in Ancient Egypt. Norman: University of Oklahoma Press. .
 
Hornung, Erik; Abt, Theodor (editors): The Egyptian Amduat. The Book of the Hidden Chamber. English translation by David Warburton, revised and edited by Erik Hornung and Theodor Abt. Living Human Heritage Publications, Zurich 2007. (Images, hieroglyphs, transcription and English translation).
 Knowledge for the Afterlife - the Egyptian Amduat - a quest for immortality (1963), Theodore Abt and Erik Hornung, Living Human Heritage.

External links
 The Book of Am-Tuat by Wallis Budge
 The Book of the Hidden Chamber
 list of deities in the Book of What is in the Netherworld
 amduat-achilles.de

Ancient Egyptian funerary texts
Egyptian underworld